Nga Yiu Tau is a village of in the Shap Sze Heung area of Sai Kung North, in Tai Po District, Hong Kong, located near the shore of Three Fathoms Cove.

Features
The Shap Sze Heung Tsung Tsin Church of the Tsung Tsin Mission of Hong Kong was built in Nga Yiu Tau in 1960. It had been initially located in the Yat Sun School in nearby Tseng Tau since 1954. The building is now vacant.

References

External links

 Delineation of area of existing village Nga Iu Tau Tsun (Sai Kung North) for election of resident representative (2019 to 2022)

Villages in Tai Po District, Hong Kong
Sai Kung North